Moad Zahafi (born 9 May 1998) is a Moroccan runner who specializes in the 800 metres.

He represented Morocco at the 2019 Summer Universiade in Naples, Italy and he won the silver medal in the men's 800 metres event. He also competed at the 2019 African Games and the 2019 World Championships without reaching the final.

Zahafi competes at the collegiate level for Texas Tech. On 16 April 2022, he ran a world-leading time of 1:43.69 at the Tom Jones Memorial in Gainesville, Florida, recording the third-fastest time in NCAA history.

References

1998 births
Living people
Moroccan male middle-distance runners
Universiade silver medalists for Morocco
Athletes (track and field) at the 2019 African Games
African Games competitors for Morocco
World Athletics Championships athletes for Morocco
Universiade medalists in athletics (track and field)
Medalists at the 2019 Summer Universiade
Texas Tech Red Raiders men's track and field athletes
Sportspeople from Casablanca
20th-century Moroccan people
21st-century Moroccan people